"Twit" (literally "dimwit") is the debut solo single by South Korean singer Hwasa. It was released on February 13, 2019 by RBW. Written by Hwasa, Kim Do-hoon and Park Woo-sang, who are also the producers of the song. The music video has nearly 100 million views, making it the third most popular Korean music video by a female soloist in 2019.

Composition
"Twit" was co-written and co-produced by Hwasa with Kim Do-hoon  and Park Woo-sang. Tamar Herman from Billboard described the song as "a bouncing pop melody, which features chirpy trap beats and tropical house elements as the artist switches between chanting raps and her soaring, powerful vocals."

Commercial performance
"Twit" peaked at number one on the South Korean digital, download and streaming chart and at number 3 on the Billboard US World Digital Songs chart. The song also debuted at number 22 on the New Zealand Hot Singles chart.

Music video and promotion
The music video teaser was released on February 12, 2019. The official music video was released on February 13, 2019. It was directed by Park Sangwon. The dance practice video was released three days later on February 16. As of December 2022, it has received over 7.5 million views.

Hwasa performed the song on several music programs in South Korea including Show! Music Core, Music Bank, Inkigayo, and M Countdown. "Twit" later won first place at MBC's Show! Music Core on March 2 and March 16.

Track listing
Download and streaming
 1. "Twit" – 3:10
 2. "Twit" (Instrumental) – 3:10

Accolades

Awards and nominations

Music program awards

Charts

Weekly charts

Monthly charts

Year-end charts

Release history

See also
List of Gaon Digital Chart number ones of 2019
List of K-pop Hot 100 number ones

References

2019 songs
2019 singles
Gaon Digital Chart number-one singles
Billboard Korea K-Pop number-one singles